was a town located in Yame District, Fukuoka Prefecture, Japan.

As of 2003, the town had an estimated population of 14,023 and a density of 103.50 persons per km². The total area was 135.49 km².

On February 1, 2010, Kurogi, along with the town of Tachibana, and the villages of Hoshino and Yabe (all from Yame District), was merged into the expanded city of Yame.

See also
Groups of Traditional Buildings

External links
 Yame official website 

Dissolved municipalities of Fukuoka Prefecture
Populated places disestablished in 2010